Sophia of Formbach (also Sophia of Vormbach) ( – after 1088), was the daughter of Meginhard V of Formbach. She was countess of Salm through her marriage to Hermann of Salm, who was also elected German anti-king from 1081 to 1088.

Life
Sophia was the daughter of Meginhard IV of Formbach and Matilda of Reinhausen, a daughter of Count Elli. 
Sophia married Hermann of Salm. The couple were closely related and there were attempts to separate them on these grounds. Hermann died in 1088. It is sometimes said that Sophia married for a second time around 1092 to Stephan II, Count of Sponheim, although this is not certain.

Sophia, like the rest of her natal dynasty (the Formbachs), was a patron of Göttweig Abbey.

Children 
With her first husband, Hermann, Sophia had the following children: 
 Otto I, Count of Salm
 Hermann II of Salm (1087–1135)
 Dietrich of Salm (fl. 1095)

If she married Stephan II of Sponheim, then Sophia was also the mother of: 
Meginhard I, Count of Sponheim
Jutta (1090-1136), founder of the female convent at the abbey of Disibodenberg
Hugh of Sponheim, archbishop of Cologne (1137)

References 
E. Hlawitschka, 'Die 'Verwandtenehe' des Gegenkönigs Hermann von Salm und seiner Frau Sophie. Ein Beitrag zu den Familienbeziehungen der rheinischen Ezzonen/Hezeliniden und des Grafenhauses von Formbach/Vormbach,' in: Schriftenreihe zur bayerischen Landesgeschichte, Band 140, (Verlag C.H. Beck München 2002)
 J. Mötsch, ‘Genealogie der Grafen von Sponheim,’ Jahrbuch für westdeutsche Landesgeschichte 13 (1987), 63-179.

Notes

External links 
genealogie-mittelalter Sophia of Formbach (in German)

1050s births

Year of birth uncertain

Year of death unknown

11th-century German nobility
11th-century German women
German countesses
German queens consort